The 2019 II liiga is the 25th season of the II liiga, fourth-highest league for association football clubs in Estonia.

II liiga North/East

2019 season

2019 II N/E liiga consists of 14 different teams. Nine of them remain the same, two were promoted from III liiga, two were relegated from higher divisions and one club (Tallinna JK Legion II) transferred from the last year's II liiga S/W. Promoted teams were Põhja-Tallinna JK Volta II and FC Jõgeva Wolves while relegated clubs were Lasnamäe FC Ajax and Tartu FC Santos.  These teams replaced Tartu Santos II (dissolved), Põhja-Tallinna JK Volta (promoted), Maardu United (relegated), Raasiku FC Joker and Tallinna JK Piraaja (transferred to II S/W Liiga).

Clubs

The following clubs are competing in II liiga North/East during the 2019 season.

a – ineligible for promotion to Esiliiga B

Results

League table

Football leagues in Estonia
4
Estonia
Estonia